Kamilou Daouda (born 29 December 1987) is a Nigerien footballer who plays as a striker for Coton Sport.

Career
His first steps where in Akokana F.C., an amateur club in Niger. He had 2 very good years before making a move to Coton Sport de Garoua, a top tier team in Cameroon's Elite One.

International career
Daouda was a member of Niger national football team, having been called up to the 2012 Africa Cup of Nations.

International goals
Scores and results list Niger's goal tally first.

References

External links
 

1987 births
Living people
People from Agadez
Nigerien footballers
Niger international footballers
2012 Africa Cup of Nations players
2013 Africa Cup of Nations players
Association football forwards
Akokana FC players
Al-Ittihad Club (Tripoli) players
CS Sfaxien players
JS Saoura players
Coton Sport FC de Garoua players
Al Khartoum SC players
Nigerien expatriate footballers
Expatriate footballers in Cameroon
Nigerien expatriate sportspeople in Cameroon
Expatriate footballers in Libya
Nigerien expatriate sportspeople in Libya
Expatriate footballers in Tunisia
Nigerien expatriate sportspeople in Tunisia
Expatriate footballers in Algeria
Nigerien expatriate sportspeople in Algeria
Expatriate footballers in Sudan
Nigerien expatriate sportspeople in Sudan
Elite One players
Libyan Premier League players
Tunisian Ligue Professionnelle 1 players
Algerian Ligue Professionnelle 1 players